Golaghat Engineering College was established in 2018 by Assam Government at Golaghat district, Assam. On 31 March 2012, Chief Minister Tarun Gogoi laid the foundation stone of the Golaghat Engineering College in Golaghat district, which was proposed by the Assam Government officially. It was officially inaugurated by chief minister, Sarbananda Sonowal on 5 February 2019.

The college starts to offer BTech degree from academic year 2018–19. The college is accredited by All India Council for Technical Education (AICTE)
The institution is affiliated to Assam Science and Technology University

It is the sixth state government engineering college of Assam.

Academics
The college offers four year B.Tech degree in Civil engineering, Chemical engineering and Mechanical engineering affiliated to Assam Science and Technology University.

Admissions
Students are taken in for the undergraduate courses through Assam Combined Entrance Examination (CEE) conducted by Assam Science and Technology University.
For lateral entry into the undergraduate courses are done through the Joint Lateral Entrance Examination(JLEE) conducted by Assam Science and Technology University.

References

Engineering colleges in Assam
Golaghat district
Educational institutions established in 2018
2018 establishments in Assam